Daniel Breen (11 August 1894 – 27 December 1969) was a volunteer in the Irish Republican Army during the Irish War of Independence and the Irish Civil War. In later years he was a Fianna Fáil politician.

Background
Breen was born in Grange, Donohill parish, County Tipperary. His father died when Breen was six, leaving the family very poor.

He was educated locally, before becoming a plasterer and later a linesman on the Great Southern Railways.

Irish Revolutionary period

War of Independence
Breen was sworn into the Irish Republican Brotherhood in 1912 and the Irish Volunteers in 1914. On 21 January 1919, the day the First Dáil met in Dublin, Breen—who described himself as "a soldier first and foremost"—took part in the Soloheadbeg ambush. The ambush party of eight men, led by Séumas Robinson, attacked two Royal Irish Constabulary men who were escorting explosives to a quarry. The two policemen, James McDonnell and Patrick O’Connell, were fatally shot during the incident. The ambush is considered to be the first incident of the Irish War of Independence. 

Breen later recalled:

However, his commanding officer, Seamus Robinson, wrote:

In the same statement, Robinson described the two policemen as he and Paddy Dwyer jumped out and seized the reins of the horse: "The RIC seemed to be at first amused at the eight of Dan Breen's burly figure with nose and mouth covered with a handkerchief; but with a sweeping glance they saw his revolver and Dwyer and me they could see only three of us. In a flash their rifles were brought up, the bolts worked and triggers pressed two shots rang out, but not from the carbines: the cut-off had been overlooked: The two shots came from Treacy [the only one with a rifle] and Tim Crowe. Those shots were the signal for general firing. At the inquest the fatal wounds were 'caused by small-calibre bullets'."

During the conflict, the British put a £1,000 price on Breen's head, which was later raised to £10,000. He quickly established himself as a leader within the Irish Republican Army (IRA). He was known for his courage. On 13 May 1919, he helped rescue his comrade Seán Hogan at gunpoint from a heavily guarded train at Knocklong station in County Limerick. Breen, who was wounded, remembered how the battalion was "vehemently denounced as a cold-blooded assassins" and roundly condemned by the Catholic Church. After the fight,  Seán Treacy, Séumas Robinson and Breen met Michael Collins in Dublin, where they were told to escape from the area. They agreed they would "fight it out, of course". Breen and Treacy shot their way out through a British military cordon in the northern suburb of Drumcondra (Fernside). They escaped, only for Treacy to be killed the next day in a shootout with British forces. Breen was shot at least four times, twice in the lung.

The British reaction was to make Tipperary a Special Military Area, with curfews and travel permits. Volunteer GHQ authorised enterprising attacks on barracks. Richard Mulcahy noted that British policy had "pushed rather turbulent spirits such as Breen and Treacy into the Dublin area". The inculcation of the principles of guerrilla warfare was to become an essential part of all training. Breen and Treacy were original members of Collins' The Squad of assassins, later known as the Dublin Guard, when Tipperary became "too hot for them". and Dublin was the centre of the war.

Breen was present in December 1919 at the ambush in Ashtown beside Phoenix Park in Dublin where Martin Savage was killed while trying to assassinate the Lord Lieutenant of Ireland, Viscount French. The IRA men hid behind hedges and a dungheap as the convoy of vehicles came past. They had been instructed to ignore the first car, but this contained their target, Lord French. Their roadblock failed as a policeman removed the horse and cart intended to stop the car.

Civil War
Breen rejected the Anglo-Irish Treaty, which left him angry and embittered:

Although he had tried hard to avoid a conflict with his comrades after returning home from America in early 1922, Breen eventually joined the Anti-Treaty IRA in its fight against the Provisional Government of Ireland. He was captured in a major state operation in Tipperary in April 1923.

Regarding the continued existence of Northern Ireland from 1922, and an inevitable further war to conquer it to create a united Ireland, Breen commented:

In the June 1922 general election, Breen was nominated as a candidate by both the pro- and anti-Treaty sides, in the Waterford–Tipperary East constituency, but was not elected.

Post-Civil War
In August 1923, while still in custody in Limerick Prison, Breen was elected to Dáil Éireann at the 1923 general election as a Republican anti-Treaty Teachta Dála (TD) for the Tipperary constituency. He spent two months there before going on hunger strike for six days, followed by a thirst strike of six days. Breen was released in the autumn after signing a document to desist from attacking the Free State. 

Breen wrote a best-selling account of his guerrilla days, My Fight for Irish Freedom, in 1924, later republished by Rena Dardis and Anvil Press.

Politics

Fianna Fáil TD
In January 1927, he became the first anti-Treaty TD to take the Oath of Allegiance and sit in the Dáil Éireann after the establishment of the Irish Free State.

Standing as an Independent Republican he was defeated in the June 1927 general election. Thereafter Breen travelled to the United States, where he opened a speakeasy. He returned to Ireland in 1932 following the death of his mother, and regained his seat as a member of Fianna Fáil in the Dáil at that year's general election. He represented his Tipperary constituency without a break until his retirement at the 1965 election.

Foreign policy views
Breen supported the Republican side during the Spanish Civil War.

During World War II, he was said to hold largely pro-Axis views, with admiration for Erwin Rommel. When the fascist political party Ailtirí na hAiséirghe failed to win any seats in the 1944 Irish general election, he remarked that he was sorry that the party had not done better, as he had studied their programme and found a lot to commend. In 1946, Breen became secretary of the Save the German Children Society. He attended the funeral of Nazi spy Hermann Gortz on 27 May 1947. Irish-American John S. Monagan visited Breen in 1948, and was surprised to see two pictures of Adolf Hitler, a medallion of Napoleon and a Telefunken radio. Breen told him "the revolution didn't work out," and "to get the government they have now, I wouldn't have lost a night's sleep." He also said that he fought for freedom, but not for democracy. In 1943, Breen sent his "congratulations to the Führer. May he live long to lead Europe on the road to peace, security and happiness". After the end of World War II in Europe, the German Legation in Dublin was taken over by diplomats from the USA in May 1945, and ".. they found a recent letter from Breen asking the German minister to forward his birthday wishes to the Führer, just days before Hitler committed suicide."

Breen was co-chairman of the anti-Vietnam War organisation "Irish Voice on Vietnam" which he founded along with Peadar O'Donnell.

Personal life

Breen was married on 12 June 1921, during the War of Independence, to Brigid Malone, a Dublin Cumann na mBan woman and sister of Lieutenant Michael Malone who was killed in action at the Battle of Mount Street Bridge during the 1916 Rising. They had met in Dublin when she helped to nurse him while he was recovering from a bullet wound.

Seán Hogan was best man, and the bride's sister Aine Malone was the bridesmaid. Photographs of the wedding celebrations taken by 5th Battalion intelligence officer Séan Sharkey are published in The Tipperary Third Brigade a photographic record. Breen was, at the time, one of the most wanted men in Ireland, and South Tipperary was under martial law, yet a large celebration was held. The wedding took place at Purcell's, "Glenagat House", New Inn, County Tipperary. Many of the key members of the Third Tipperary Brigade attended, including flying column leaders Dinny Lacey and Hogan. Breen was the brother in-law of Commandant Theobald Wolfe Tone FitzGerald, the painter of the Irish Republic Flag that flew over the GPO during the Easter Rising in 1916.

The Breens had two children, Donal and Granya. Breen was an atheist.

Death
Breen died in Kilcroney House, County Wicklow in 1969, aged 75, and was buried in Donohill, near his birthplace. His funeral was the largest seen in west Tipperary since that of his close friend and comrade-in-arms, Seán Treacy, at Kilfeacle in October 1920. An estimated attendance of 10,000 mourners assembled in the tiny hamlet, giving ample testimony to the esteem in which he was held.

Breen was the subject of a 2007 biography, Dan Breen and the IRA by Joe Ambrose.

In popular culture
Breen is mentioned in the Irish folk ballad "The Galtee Mountain Boy", along with Seán Moylan, Dinny Lacey, and Seán Hogan. The song, written by Patsy Halloran, recalls some of the travels of a "Flying column" from Tipperary as they fought during the Irish War of Independence, and later against the pro-Treaty side during the Irish Civil War.

The trophy for the Tipperary Senior Hurling Championship is named in his honor.

References

Bibliography

Writings

Secondary sources

External links

Lyrics and music to the Ballad of Dan Breen The Ballad Of Dan Breen Song Lyrics
Lyrics and music to the Galtee Mountain Boy The Galtee Mountain Boy Irish Folk lyrics guitar chords & sheet music
 Breen the gunman - a blurred line Breen the Gunman: A Blurred Line
 Ricorso Dan Breen
 An Irishman's diary

1894 births
1969 deaths
Early Sinn Féin TDs
Fianna Fáil TDs
Irish Republican Army (1919–1922) members
Irish Republican Army (1922–1969) members
Members of the 4th Dáil
Members of the 7th Dáil
Members of the 8th Dáil
Members of the 9th Dáil
Members of the 10th Dáil
Members of the 11th Dáil
Members of the 12th Dáil
Members of the 13th Dáil
Members of the 14th Dáil
Members of the 15th Dáil
Members of the 16th Dáil
Members of the 17th Dáil
People of the Irish War of Independence
Politicians from County Tipperary

Templates Infobox